Adler railway station is a railway station in Adler District of Sochi. It is located on the North Caucasus Railway, a regional subsidiary of Russian Railways, and one of the largest rail passenger terminals in Russia.

History
Construction of the new railway station began in November 2010 to replace the existing one, which is located to the west. It is a hall of 150 by 60 m, in two parts, one on the side of the sea, and one on the city side. There is a car park, and the roof features solar collectors, which are used for heating.

The new station has a capacity of 3000 to 5000 passengers per hour in normal operation and up to 20,000 passengers on the opening day of the 2014 Olympic Games. Construction was completed in 2013.

The station was opened on 28 October 2013 in the presence of Russian President Vladimir Putin and Thomas Bach, the chair of the International Olympic Committee.

Trains
 Saratov – Adler
 St.Petersburg – Adler
 Nizhny Novgorod – Adler
 Moscow – Adler
 Krasnoyarsk – Adler
 Novosibirsk – Adler
 Minsk – Adler
 Vorkuta – Adler
 Yekaterinburg – Adler
 Chelyabinsk – Adler
 Perm – Adler
 Kaliningrad – Adler
 Gomel – Adler
 Rostov-on-Don – Adler
 Kislovodsk – Adler
 Vladikavkaz – Adler
 Krasnodar – Adler (Lastochka)
 Maykop – Adler (Lastochka)
 Mineralnye Vody – Adler (Lastochka)

Gallery

References

External links
 Train times on Yandex

Railway stations in Sochi
Railway stations in Russia opened in 2013